Megabyte (MB) is a decimallized unit of data storage measurement equalling 106 bytes.

Megabyte may also refer to:

 Mebibyte (MiB), the idiomatic unit of data storage measurement, equal to 220 bytes, similar to "megabyte" (MB).
 Megabyte (ReBoot), a fictional character from the CG animated TV fictional universe ReBoot
 MEGABYTE Act of 2016 (Making Electronic Government Accountable By Yielding Tangible Efficiencies) H.R. 4904, a federal law of the United States of America

See also
 Megabite (disambiguation)
 Megabit (Mb) 106 bits
 Mebibit (Mib) 220 bits
 M-Byte, a battery electric car from Sino-American marque Byton, see Future Mobility Corporation
 MB (disambiguation)
 Mega (disambiguation)
 Byte (disambiguation)